An animal bath or balneum animale is a medical treatment in which the skin or carcass of a freshly slaughtered animal is wrapped around the patient. The treatment's goal is transference of the animal's vitality to the patient, with the warmth of the treatment perhaps having a therapeutic effect. The treatment has been used since antiquity and was thought to be effective for lameness. The young Kaiser Wilhelm II had a left arm palsied from birth and was given this treatment.

History 
Animal baths were used since antiquity as medical treatments. The skin or carcass of a freshly slaughtered animal is wrapped around the patient or a limb was inserted into blood or stomach of a living animal. The treatment was intended to transfer the animal's vitality to the patient, with the warmth of the treatment perhaps having a therapeutic effect.

Indication and effectiveness 
Animal baths were thought to be effective for lameness.

Recipients 
The young Kaiser Wilhelm II—whose left arm was palsied from birth—was given this treatment; his arm was placed in the body of a freshly slaughtered hare for 30 minutes twice a week to encourage it to grow normally.

References 

Balneotherapy